Thomas William Soutar (16 March 1893 – 14 June 1981) was a professional athlete and an Australian rules footballer who played with St Kilda in the Victorian Football League (VFL).

Family
The son of Thomas Soutar, and Margaret Soutar, née Dunne, Thomas William Soutar was born at Prahran on 16 March 1893.

He married Vera Grace Veale (1896-1988), at Subiaco, on 24 November 1923. They had two children, Douglas William Soutar (b.1924), and Mavis Vera Soutar (b.1926).

Athlete

He was a fine middle-distance runner. winning the professional mile handicap at the 1914 Easter Gift Meeting at Stawell; and, during his service with the First AIF, on the basis of having won both the 880 yards and the mile at the Egyptian Expeditionary Force's 1919 Sports in Cairo,<ref>[http://nla.gov.au/nla.news-article120311956 'Prodigal', "Inter-Allied Games, The Referee, (Wednesday, 9 July 1919), p.12.]</ref> he was selected to be part of the team that represented Australia in the Inter-Allied Games, held at the Pershing Stadium, near Paris from 22 June 1919 to 6 July 1919.Stawell Easter Sports, The Hopetoun Courier and Mallee Pioneer, (Friday, 24 April 1914), p.3.An outdoor group portrait of the Australian athletes participating in the Inter Allied Games held at the Pershing Stadium, Paris in June-July 1919, collection of the Australian War Memorial: Soutar is at the extreme right of the fifth row from the front.
"In army sports there is no distinction between amateur and professional … During the latter part of the war in 27 championship brigade and divisional events over 440 yards, 880 yards and one mile, Soutar was never beaten …" — The (Perth) Mirror, 16 November 1935.

Football
One of nine new players in the team, Soutar played his only First XVIII match for St Kilda against Carlton, at Princes park, on 29 July 1911. They were required because many of the regular St Kilda First XVIII  players were on strike.

The other new players were: Alby Bowtell, Roy Cazaly, Claude Crowl, Peter Donnelly, Alf Hammond, Otto Opelt, Rowley Smith, and Bill Ward — and, including that match, and ignoring Harrie Hattam (16 games), Bert Pierce (41 games), and Bill Woodcock (65 games), the very inexperienced team's remaining fifteen players had only played a total of 46 matches.

He trained with Melbourne in the 1920 pre-season, but did not play with them.

He played with West Perth in 1920 on his return to Australia from his overseas service in the First AIF.

Military service
He enlisted in the First AIF at Perth, Western Australia on 9 March 1915; and, leaving Fremantle, Western Australia on 2 September 1915 on HMAT Anchises (A68), and served overseas with the 10th Light Horse Regiment.

His post-war repatriation to Australia was delayed when, as part of the A.I.F. Educational Scheme, he attended a course in bookkeeping at Clark's College, in Chancellery Lane, London in September/October 1919. He returned to Australia on the HT Konigin Luise'', leaving England on 19 December 1919, arriving in Fremantle on 20 January 1920, and was discharged from the AIF on 30 March 1920.

Death
He died, in Western Australia, on 14 June 1981, and has a memorial plaque at Karrakatta Cemetery.

Notes

References

 Wythe, G., Hanson, J.M., & Birger, C.V. (eds), The Inter-Allied Games, Paris, 22nd June to 6th July 1919, The Games Committee, (Paris), 1919.
 Tom Soutar: West Perth's New Skipper, The (Perth) Leader, (Friday, I July 1927), p.7.
 World War One Embarkation Roll: Private Thomas William Soutar (1196), collection of the Australian War Memorial.
 World War One Service Record: Lance-Corporal Thomas William Soutar (1196), National Archives of Australia.
 World War One Nominal Roll: Private Thomas William Soutar (1196), collection of the Australian War Memorial: note that this, mistakenly, lists his family name as "Goutar" (also, note that there is no entry for him in the nominal roll under the family name "Soutar").
 League Football Teams: West Perth, The West Australian, (Saturday, 7 July 1928), p.6.

External links 

1893 births
1981 deaths
Australian rules footballers from Melbourne
St Kilda Football Club players
South Yarra Football Club players
West Perth Football Club players
West Perth Football Club coaches
West Perth Football Club administrators
Burials at Karrakatta Cemetery
Military personnel from Western Australia